Salem Suroor Al-Alawi is a former Saudi Arabian footballer who played as a midfielder for the Saudi Arabia national team and Al-Shabab.

References

External links

1972 births
Saudi Arabian footballers
Living people
1992 King Fahd Cup players
1992 AFC Asian Cup players
Al-Shabab FC (Riyadh) players
Saudi Professional League players
Saudi Arabia international footballers
Association football midfielders